Seobuksan is a mountain in South Korea. It is about eight miles west of Masan in Gyeongsangnam-do.

See also
 List of mountains in Korea

Notes

References
 

Mountains of South Korea
Mountains of South Gyeongsang Province